Shirin in Love is an Iranian-American romantic comedy film directed by Ramin Niami and starring Nazanin Boniadi, Riley Smith, Maz Jobrani and Anahita Khalatbari. It was released in March 2014 via AMC Independent.

Plot

Shirin is an absent-minded, yet sophisticated, young Iranian-American woman who lives in "Tehrangeles", the large Iranian community of Los Angeles. While Shirin has been engaged for years to a successful Iranian plastic surgeon in Beverly Hills, she lives with her overbearing mother and empathetic father. When she falls in love with a mysterious young man who lives in a lighthouse in Northern California, a secret unravels and cultures clash, challenging all the tradition Shirin grew up with - and she re-discovers herself in the process.

Cast
 George Wallace as Officer Washington
 Amy Madigan as Rachel Harson
 Nazanin Boniadi as Shirin
 Riley Smith as William
 Marshall Manesh as Nader
 Maz Jobrani as Mike
 Anahita Khalatbari as Maryam
 Max Amini as Ed
 Annie Little as Vicky
 Samantha Colburn as Helen
 Steven Schub as Rick
 Sam Golzari as Ben
 Nick Soper as Officer Clifford
 Andy Madadian as Andy
 Mervin Gilbert as Dale
 Aycil Yeltan as Sasha
 Carryl Lynn as Sylvia

References

External links
 

Films directed by Ramin Niami
2014 films
2014 romantic comedy films
American romantic comedy films
Films set in California
Films set in Los Angeles
Iranian-American films
Comedy films about Asian Americans
2010s American films